Patrick Omer Nyamsi Tobo (born 9 September 1962) is a former Cameroon international football defender who played club football in Cameroon and Canada. He works as an assistant for the Canada men's national youth soccer teams.

Club career
Born in Cameroon, Tobo began playing club football in the second division with for Nlonago Nkongsamba and AS Ngoumou. From 1980 to 1992, he first division sides Lion de Yaoundé, Union Douala, Canon Yaoundé, Prévoyance CNPS  and Tonnerre Yaoundé, winning a league and cup double with Canon in 1983 and a second cup with Prévoyance CNPS in 1989.

In 1992, Tobo moved to Canada where he would play in the National Soccer League with Toronto Italia and North York Astros before retiring in 1996.

Career as manager
After retiring from playing football, Tobo studied to become a coach. He received a Canadian 'A' Licence and a UEFA 'A' Licence, and began working with Canada's youth national teams.

International career
Tobo made appearances for the senior Cameroon national football team, including the 1981 Central African Games in Angola, and he played for Cameroon at the 1981 FIFA World Youth Championship finals in Australia.

References

External links

1962 births
Living people
Cameroonian footballers
Cameroon international footballers
Cameroon under-20 international footballers
Canadian Soccer League (1998–present) players
Union Douala players
Canon Yaoundé players
Tonnerre Yaoundé players
Toronto Italia players
North York Astros players
Canadian National Soccer League players
Association football defenders
Cameroonian expatriate footballers
Cameroonian expatriate sportspeople in Canada
Expatriate soccer players in Canada